Jc Caylen (born Justin Caylan Castillo; September 11, 1992) is an American YouTube personality from Houston, Texas.

Early life and education
Caylen was born in Houston, Texas. He and his family moved to San Antonio, Texas, where he grew up. He has three siblings; Jaylyn, Ava Grace and Joe Felix. His parents divorced when he was very young. Caylen attended high school at Sandra Day O'Connor High School in Helotes, Texas. He briefly attended The University of Texas at San Antonio before dropping out to focus on his YouTube career.

Career
Caylen began his career on YouTube, uploading his first public video to his channel, Life with Jc, in 2010. Caylen also gained exposure due to the YouTube supergroup Our2ndLife where he, Connor Franta, Ricky Dillon, Kian Lawley, Trevi Moran and Sam Pottorff went on an international tour and amassed a total 2.7 million subscribers before the group broke up in December 2014.

In 2015, Caylen's compilation album Neptones hit number one on the Top Dance/rap Albums chart, according to Billboard Magazine, the album was from Heard Well, a record label started by YouTube user Connor Franta, CAA new Agent Andrew Graham and entrepreneur Jeremy Wineberg.

In addition to his YouTube career, Caylen also has appeared as an actor in several films and television series. In an interview with AOL, Caylen stated about his YouTube presence affecting his acting career, saying "I'd say that it's impacted my career so much because people see my personality on YouTube and they want to work with me more.. It's almost like a video resume because I have my own personality on YouTube and since I don't play a character, they can see who I am and what I'm about. I feel like they know me on a personal level and know what I will be like to work with." Caylen played Mikey in the 2016 Tyler Perry comedy Boo! A Madea Halloween, and its 2017 sequel, Boo 2! A Madea Halloween.

Filmography

Television

Films

See also
Internet celebrity
List of YouTubers
Social impact of YouTube

References

External links 
 

1992 births
American people of Cuban descent
People from San Antonio
YouTubers from Texas
Male actors from California
American male film actors
20th-century American male actors
Living people
University of Texas at San Antonio alumni
YouTube vloggers
Comedy YouTubers
Music YouTubers
Twitch (service) streamers
American male television actors
21st-century American male actors
21st-century American singers
21st-century American male singers